The Louisville Project is a project by the University of Louisville's policy debate team (the University of Louisville Debate Society or ULDS) to increase meaningful minority participation in debate, which started in 2000.

Mission
Led by Coach Ede Warner, Louisville eschewed traditional forms of debating like speed reading, debating the resolution, and presenting traditional forms of evidence. The Louisville Project instead uses hip hop music, personal experiences, and other media to present their arguments. They argue that many elements of policy debate are exclusionary and ask the judge to cast their ballot in order to sign onto their project and in turn, increase diversity in debate.

In 2005, Louisville started a "take it to the streets" initiative in which they offered to debate the topic normally if the judge was replaced with a lay person. Because of the time required to find a new critic, the rounds were to take place with reduced speech times, approximately equivalent to those of Lincoln-Douglas debate. Most teams accepted the agreement and Louisville lost the vast majority of those debates.

End of the project
In November 2005, Ede Warner announced, on the collegiate debate message board eDebate, his resignation as the Cross Examination Debate Association 2nd vice president, canceled the University of Louisville's debate tournament (the "Super Bowl of Debate"), and announced his plans to stop recruiting debaters and retire in 5 years. This is regarded by many in the debate community as the beginning of the end of the Louisville Project.

Legacy
Other colleges continued the mission of the project in various ways.  Using techniques pioneered by Louisville, in 2013 Emporia State University's Ryan Wash and Elijah Smith won both the National Debate Tournament and the Cross Examination Debate Association tournament

MPOWER Movement
Louisville has continued "The Project" through the 2006–2007 season and has now become self-titled as the MPOWER (Multi-cultural policy organizing with emancipatory rhetoric) Movement. The MPOWER Movement seeks to implement policies into the debate community that will enhance multi-cultural education in collegiate debate. Louisville advocates a 10-demand plan which was distributed to the debate community during the 2006–07 season at competitions. The team uses these points to support their argument that collegiate debate is currently exclusive of minority groups based on race, economics, gender, sexuality and communicative differences. The success of the Louisville team fluctuated during the 2006–07 season. In the end, two teams qualified for elimination rounds at CEDA Nationals where two members also received speaking awards.

In media
 Louisville was featured prominently in the National Debate Tournament documentary on CBS College Sports Network.
 The 2007 HBO Documentary Resolved featured a team from Jordan High School that competed using the ideals of The Project.

References

External links
 UofLDebate.com
Ede Warner and the history of narrative debate at The New York Times

University of Louisville
Policy debate
2000 establishments in Kentucky
Projects established in 2000